Opsarius bernatziki is a fish in the Opsarius genus of the family Cyprinidae. It is found in Thailand , Southeast Myanmar, and the Malay Peninsula.

References

Fish of Thailand
bernatziki
Taxa named by Frederik Petrus Koumans
Fish described in 1937